Prisons in Honduras house an estimated 12,000 prisoners in Honduras, with a general population of 8 million. There have been a number of massacres, including 69 people killed in a rural prison outside La Ceiba called La Granja (The Farm) in April 2003. On April 26, 2008, 9 people were massacred in a prison located in the center of San Pedro Sula. On May 3, 2008, 18 prisoners were massacred in a prison to the north of Tegucigalpa, the capital city of Honduras. Due to problems with street gangs, prisoners are divided into 3 groups: Maras (active gang members), Pesetas (former gang members) and paisas (those who have never been in a gang before their incarceration).

Actual population

See also
 Comayagua prison fire

References

External links
Smith-Spark, Lauren. "Nasty, harsh, overcrowded: Life in a Honduran prison." CNN. Wednesday February 15, 2012.

 
Tegucigalpa
Riots and civil disorder in Honduras